Francis M. Tull (August 12, 1851 – May 7, 1931) was an American politician in the state of Washington. He served in the Washington House of Representatives from 1893 to 1897.

References

1851 births
1931 deaths
Republican Party members of the Washington House of Representatives